S5 is a line on the Berlin S-Bahn. It operates from Strausberg Nord to Westkreuz over:
the Strausberg–Strausberg Nord line, completed in 1955 and electrified in 1956,
a section of the Prussian Eastern line, opened on 1 October 1866 and electrified on 6 November 1928,
the Stadtbahn, opened on 7 February 1882 and electrified on 11 June 1928.

References

Berlin S-Bahn lines
Transport in Strausberg